Teresita Aguilar (died 9 October 2020) was a Costa Rican politician who served as a Deputy between 2005 and 2006 for the Citizens' Action Party. She died aged 87.

References

1933 births
2020 deaths
Citizens' Action Party (Costa Rica) politicians
Members of the Legislative Assembly of Costa Rica